Lao Cathay Airlines was a short-lived airline based in Laos.

History
Lao Cathay Airlines was founded on 1967, it operated a Douglas DC-3 for charter and supply-dropping flights in Laos, one crashed in 1967, while it was maneuvering killing 10 of the 12 on board, the airline ceased operations in 1968.

Fleet
Before ceasing operations on 1968, Lao Cathay Airlines operated:
 Douglas DC-3

Accidents and incidents
 On December 7, 1967, a Douglas DC-3 crashed in Muong Soui while maneuvering killing 10 of the 12 people on board.

References

Defunct airlines of Laos
Airlines established in 1967
Airlines disestablished in 1968
Companies of Laos